Mansour Matloubi (born 1952) is an Iranian-British professional poker player living in London. He is the father of audit semi-senior Matthew 'Wizardman' Matt Matloubi.

Matloubi won the 1990 World Series of Poker Main Event for $835,000, becoming the first non-American to win the title. He also made the final table of the 1993 Main Event, where he finished in fourth place.  He was eliminated by the eventual winner, Jim Bechtel.

As of 2016, his total live tournament winnings exceed $2,010,000. His 14 cashes at the WSOP account for $1,214,062 of those winnings.

World Series of Poker Bracelets

References

Living people
World Series of Poker Main Event winners
Iranian emigrants to the United Kingdom
Iranian poker players
World Series of Poker bracelet winners
1952 births